USS Nanticoke (AOG-66), was a type T1  built for the US Navy during World War II. She was named after the Nanticoke River, in Delaware and Maryland.

Construction
Nanticoke was laid down on 16 January 1945, under a Maritime Commission (MARCOM) contract, MC hull 2626, by the St. Johns River Shipbuilding Company, Jacksonville, Florida; sponsored by Mrs. Gustav W. Nelson; acquired by the Navy 31 August 1945; and commissioned 1 September 1945.

Service history
Assigned to the Naval Transportation Service, Nanticoke reported for duty on 18 October, to the Service Force, US Atlantic Fleet. Arriving at Norfolk, Virginia, on 28 November, she was decommissioned there on 4 January 1946, and returned to MARCOM on 12 January 1946.

Briefly operated by the American Petroleum Transport Corporation as MV Sugarland in 1946, she was acquired later in the year by the Argentine Navy and commissioned as ARA Punta Delgada (B–16). She served as part of the Argentine Navy until 1984, when she burnt and sank off La Plata, 4 March 1985.

References

Bibliography

External links 
 Auke Visser's Famous T - Tankers Pages
 ARA Punta Delgada page in "Histarmar" website 

 

Klickitat-class gasoline tankers
Ships built in Jacksonville, Florida
1945 ships
Ships transferred from the United States Navy to the Argentine Navy
James River Reserve Fleet